The 1979 Big League World Series took place from August 11–18 in Fort Lauderdale, Florida, United States. West Hempstead, New York defeated Orlando, Florida in the championship game.

Teams

Results

Notes

References

Big League World Series
Big League World Series